Bruno de Cazenove (born 7 February 1952) is a French sailor. He competed in the Tornado event at the 1976 Summer Olympics.

References

External links
 

1952 births
Living people
French male sailors (sport)
Olympic sailors of France
Sailors at the 1976 Summer Olympics – Tornado
Place of birth missing (living people)